Senjanak (also Romanized as Senjānak, Sindzhanak, and Sinjānak; also known as Senjāk) is a village in Ilat-e Qaqazan-e Sharqi Rural District, Kuhin District, Qazvin County, Qazvin Province, Iran. At the 2006 census, its population was 511, in 82 families.

References 

Populated places in Qazvin County